The Paraavis Tango is a Russian single-place paraglider, designed and produced by Paraavis of Moscow. Introduced in the 2000s, it remained in production though 2016.

Design and development
The aircraft was designed as a beginner glider, suitable for school use for flight training.

Variants
Tango 19
Extra small-sized model for very light pilots. The glider model is not certified.
Tango 22
Small-sized model for light-weight pilots. The glider model is not certified.
Tango 24
Small-sized model for light-weight pilots. The glider model is not certified.
Tango 26
Mid-sized model for medium-weight pilots. The glider model is not certified.
Tango 28
Mid-sized model for medium-weight pilots. The glider model is AFNOR Standard certified.
Tango 31
Large-sized model for heavier pilots. The glider model is not certified.
Tango 34
Extra large-sized model for heavier pilots. The glider model is not certified.
Tango 36
Very large-sized model for much heavier pilots. The glider model is not certified.

Specifications (Tango 28)

References

External links

Tango
Paragliders